Michael Ellsberg (born May 12, 1977) is an American author, blogger, and public speaker. In 2011, he published The Education of Millionaires: It's Not What You Think and It's Not Too Late.

Personal life
Ellsberg was born in San Francisco to Daniel Ellsberg and Patricia Marx Ellsberg;, the daughter of American toy maker Louis Marx. He is the younger half-brother of author and publisher Robert Ellsberg and epidemiologist Mary Ellsberg. He grew up in Berkeley, and attended Deerfield Academy. He received a degree in International Relations from Brown University in 1999. Ellsberg was married to Jena la Flamme, but the couple divorced in 2014.

Writing career
Ellsberg has written about the power of body language. His first book, The Power of Eye Contact: Your Secret for Success in Business, Love, and Life, was published in 2010. His second book, The Education of Millionaires: It’s Not What You Think and It’s Not Too Late, was published in 2011. For this book, Ellsberg interviewed millionaires and billionaires who do not have college degrees (including Matt Mullenweg, Pink Floyd’s David Gilmour, Sean Parker, and Marc Ecko). The book was profiled in Time Magazine, who called the book an "assault on higher education", and in the New York Times.

Ellsberg also writes for Forbes.

Other projects
Ellsberg is credited for inventing "eye-gazing parties," a craze in 2010 where participants stare deeply into each other's eyes and follow up if they feel they made a connection. He is also a book editor and has spoken at Google and Peter Thiel's Fellow Retreat.

Ellsberg has written about men's role in the #MeToo movement. He claims to have "been that guy" before, and encourages men to reflect on examples of boorish sexual behavior, such as the viral Cat Person story, which is written from the perspective of a twenty-year-old woman who goes on a date with a much older man and ends up having an unpleasant sexual experience that was consensual but unwanted. Ellsberg has asked men to pledge to get a verbal or nonverbal yes before initiating any sexual encounter, and to slow down if there's ever doubt the other person wants to continue.

Bibliography

References

External links
Ellsberg.com

1977 births
Living people
Writers from San Francisco
American male bloggers
American people of Austrian-Jewish descent
American bloggers
American social sciences writers
Jewish American writers
Brown University alumni
Deerfield Academy alumni
21st-century American non-fiction writers
21st-century American Jews